WZBO (1260 AM) is a radio station broadcasting a classic country format also heard on WCNC. Licensed to Edenton, North Carolina, United States, it serves the Elizabeth City-Nags Head area. The station is currently owned by Lawrence & Margaret Loesch.

History
At one time, WZBO and WCNC played adult standards from Music of Your Life. Later, the stations offered Spanish language programming.

External links

ZBO